Triangulum Minus (Latin for the Smaller Triangle) was a constellation created by Johannes Hevelius. Its name is sometimes wrongly written as Triangulum Minor. It was formed from the southern parts of his Triangula (plural form of Triangulum), alongside Triangulum Majus, but is no longer in use. The triangle was defined by the fifth-magnitude stars ι Trianguli, 10 Trianguli, and 12 Trianguli.

Also known as TZ Trianguli, 6 Trianguli is a multiple star system with a combined magnitude of 4.7, whose main component is a yellow giant of spectral type G5III.

References

External links
 http://www.ianridpath.com/startales/triangulumminus.htm
 http://www.pa.msu.edu/people/horvatin/Astronomy_Facts/obsolete_pages/triangulum_minor.htm

Former constellations
Constellations listed by Johannes Hevelius